Mailangi Styles (born 6 June 1984) is a former professional rugby league footballer who played in the 2000s, he played for the Manly-Warringah Sea Eagles of the National Rugby League and Leigh Centurions. He played 1 match for the Sea Eagles in 2006.

References

1984 births
Australian sportspeople of Tongan descent
Australian rugby league players
Leigh Leopards players
Living people
Manly Warringah Sea Eagles players
Rugby league props
Rugby league players from Sydney